Ceroprepes jilongensis is a species of snout moth in the genus Ceroprepes. It was described by Y. Du, S. Song and D. Yang in 2005 and is known from China.

References

Moths described in 2005
Phycitinae